Events in the year 1821 in Portugal.

Incumbents
Monarch: John VI 
President of the Regency: Manuel António de Sampaio Melo e Castro Moniz Torres de Lusignan (from January)
Minister of the Kingdom: Inácio da Costa Quintela (from 4 July to 7 September), Francisco Duarte Coelho (interim, from 14 August to 7 September), Filipe Ferreira de Araújo e Castro (from 7 September), José da Silva Carvalho (interim, from 7 September to 8 October)

Events
 January - General Extraordinary and Constituent Courts of the Portuguese Nation 
 Cortes Gerais e Extraordinárias da Nação Portuguesa drafts the basis for a new constitution, proposes the closure of Portuguese Inquisition
 July 4 - Return of John VI from Brazil, who approves on that day the Bases da Constituição

References

 
Portugal
Portugal
Years of the 19th century in Portugal